Nina Hossain is a British journalist and presenter employed by ITN as the lead presenter of the ITV Lunchtime News.

Background
Hossain was born in Huddersfield, West Yorkshire, England to a Bangladeshi father and an English mother. Her father, Tabarek Hossain (1935–2002), was born in British India (now Bangladesh) and migrated to Britain in the 1960s (when Bangladesh was still East Pakistan). He was a psychiatrist with a specialism in alcoholism, who set up the Kirklees Alcohol Advisory Service in 1973 at the town centre, and was the founder and president of Concern For Mental Health in West Yorkshire. Her father married an English nurse, Pamela from Nottingham. Of her Bangladeshi parentage, she states that she has never visited Bangladesh, and does not speak Bengali. She also states that while her father never discussed religion, Hossain and her younger sister, Rezina, "were nominally Muslim".

Television career
Hossain's ambitions to be a journalist began at an early age. She has a degree from the University of Durham, (St Cuthbert's Society). She then gained a postgraduate diploma in broadcast journalism at the department of Journalism, Media and Communication, University of Central Lancashire, Preston.

In 1996 she was chosen for a traineeship at ITV Border on Lookaround where she was a news presenter, producer and reporter. In 2000 she was a presenter for The Medical Channel. In 2001 she became a presenter and reporter for Newsroom South East and BBC London News on BBC London. In March 2004 she became the main presenter on the programme whilst Emily Maitlis took maternity leave.

She was the word pronouncer for Series 1 of Hard Spell, a BBC One spelling competition for children. She reprised this role in the one-off episode of spin-off Star Spell (similar to Hard Spell, but with celebrities instead of children), but when Star Spell became a full series, she had joined ITV and so was replaced by BBC newsreader Mishal Husain, who continued this role through the second series of Hard Spell.

In November 2004, Hossain joined ITN as the main co-presenter for the ITV Evening News on ITV, whilst Mary Nightingale took maternity leave. Following Nightingale's return she was a relief presenter for ITV London (ITV News London) and ITV News (ITV Lunchtime News, ITV Evening News, ITV News at Ten and ITV Weekend News).

During April 2010, she was also a guest presenter for GMTV, standing in for Lorraine Kelly on GMTV with Lorraine. In June 2010, she replaced Katie Derham as a presenter of London Tonight, initially alongside Donal MacIntyre. However, on 1 November 2010 she became the sole presenter. She also presented the ITV Lunchtime News in a shared role with Alastair Stewart.

Hossain has been part of ITV's Election Live coverage for the 2015, 2017 and 2019 elections.

On 24 May 2019 it was announced Hossain would leave ITV News London and become the lead presenter of the ITV Lunchtime News. She presented her final ITV News London 6pm bulletin on 19 June 2019.

She continues to occasionally relief present ITV News at Ten.

Hossain has reported for ITV series Exposure and On Assignment.

From March until June 2020 she presented the weekly Coronavirus: Q&A on ITV.

In November 2022, Hossain appeared in an episode of Celebrity Antiques Road Trip alongside fellow news presenter Lucrezia Millarini.

Other work
In 2004, Hossain appeared in the film Trauma, which starred Colin Firth.

Hossain reads a fake news story at the end of the Duran Duran song "The Man Who Stole a Leopard" and performs the voice of the satellite navigation on "Blame the Machines", both from the band's 2010 album All You Need Is Now.

She is also the charity ambassador for Whizz Kidz, doing the 2017 Virgin London Marathon to raise funds for them.

Awards and nominations
In January 2015, she was nominated for the Services to Media award at the British Muslim Awards.

Personal life
Hossain now lives between London and the Midlands. She is divorced from her former husband of four years, Sky News studio director Craig O'Hara. Hossain has been in a relationship with her current partner, former editor of ITV's London Tonight regional news programme, Stuart Thomas, since the spring of 2005 and together they have three children.

In 2005, Hossain drew attention from the media when she was mugged on London's South Bank, and for going to work the same day, saying that she did not consider it "a big deal".

In January 2007, it was revealed that sex offender David Decoteau from London, 45, had an unhealthy interest in Hossain and that he had also sent letters to BBC newsreader Emily Maitlis.

See also
British Bangladeshi
List of British Bangladeshis

References

External links
 

Nina Hossain at Knight Ayton Management

Alumni of St Cuthbert's Society, Durham
Alumni of the University of Central Lancashire
English people of Bangladeshi descent
ITN newsreaders and journalists
ITV regional newsreaders and journalists
Journalists from Yorkshire
Living people
People from Huddersfield
Year of birth missing (living people)